The Hashid (Musnad: 𐩢𐩦𐩵𐩣) is a tribal confederation in Yemen. It is the second or third largest – after Bakil and, depending on sources, Madh'hij – yet generally recognized as the strongest and most influential. According to medieval Yemeni genealogies, Hashid and Bakil were the sons of Jashim bin Jubran bin Nawf Bin Tuba'a bin Zayd bin Amr bin Hamdan. Member tribes of the Hashid Confederation are found primarily in the mountains in the North and Northwest of the country.

In recent times, Hashid confederation had for decades been led by the powerful Abushawareb clan. The clan's influence was built on an alliance with the former President Ali Abdullah Saleh, who relied on a coalition with the most prominent leader of the Hashid tribal confederation, Sheikh Abdullah ibn Husayn al-Ahmar, to take power in 1978. Until his death on 29 December 2007, Sheikh Abdullah served as the Speaker of Parliament and was considered Yemen's second most powerful person after President Saleh (who, along with many others in the government, also is a member of a Hashid tribe).

After Sheikh Abdullah's death, his son Sadiq inherited the leadership of the confederation, with other sons Hamid al-Ahmar, a prominent businessman and Yemeni opposition leader in the Muslim Brotherhood, and Himyar Al Ahmar, the former deputy speaker of parliament – becoming influential members. With the beginning of the Arab Spring, this new tribal leadership sided with the protesters and launched a Hashid insurgency, which played an essential role in the revolution against President Ali Abdullah Saleh in May 2011, culminating in the Battle of Sana'a and mass protests that eventually forced President Saleh to step down in February 2012 after 33 years in power.  However, the resulting rift between the al-Ahmar clan and Saleh - who retained loyalty of some Hashid tribes - led to the divisions within the Hashid confederation. This, along with the suspension of financial support by Saudi Arabia over al-Ahmar's continued alliance with the Muslim Brotherhood, had contributed to their defeat in the ensuing conflict with the Houthis and led to the subsequent loss of Hashid leadership as many tribes (Bani Suraim, Usaimat, Uzer, etc.) reached a peace agreement or sided with the rebels.

History

Pre-Islamic history 
Hashid was already a well known "tribe" (sha`b) since the 1st millennium BCE and it was very frequently mentioned in Sabaic inscriptions. The Hashid, alongside the tribes Humlan and Yarsum, were a part of a tribal confederation called the Sum'ay, and they worshipped the god Ta'lab. Banu Hamdan was mentioned in Sabaic inscriptions as qayls ("chiefs") of Hashid, later Banu Hamdan acquired control over a part of Bakil and finally gave their clan name to a tribal confederation including Hashid and Bakil. In the late 3rd century Banu Hamdan (and, consequently, Hashid and Bakil) switched their alliance to Himyar. Later some groups of Hamdan migrated to Syria.

Conversion to Islam 
In the year 622, Muhammad sent Khalid ibn al-Walid to Yemen to call them to Islam. Khaled managed to convert the Najrani and Tihami Yemenis to Islam but he didn't get a warm response from the Hamdani Yemenis of the highlands. So Muhammad delegated the task to Ali ibn Abi Talib, who was much more successful in converting the Hamdani Yemenis.

After the death of Muhammad the Hamdan tribe remained Muslim and didn't join the ridda movement.

After Ali, Power Vacuum in Yemen and the Imam Hadi 
The Hamdan tribe remained on the side of Ali, even after the martyrdom of Ali and later his sons. The tribes remained on alliance to Ali but didn't oppose the Ummayas or ally themselves with the other Shias.

At that time Yemen was experiencing a great population movement forming the bulk of the Islamic Expansion mainly settling in southern Iraq.  However, the majority of the Hamdan tribe remained in Yemen which later helped the Hashid/Bakil Hamdani tribes become the biggest local key player, benefiting from the departure of the bulk of the most powerful Nomadic Yemeni tribes of that time into North Africa/Spain in Wetsward movements that continued until the 13th century.

By The 10th century the Imam al-Hadi Yahya bin al-Hussain bin al-Qasim (a scion of Imam al-Hasan, grandson of the Prophet) who, at Sa'da, in 893-7 C.E. arrived to the Northern Highlands on invitation from the Hamdan tribe and from that time till present day the Zaidi moderate Shia teachings became dominant in north Yemen.

Modern history 
Many writers have referred to the Hashid and Bakil confederations as the "two wings" of the Zaidi imamate; in the sense that many of the tribes that belong to these confederations are and were strongly committed to Zaidi Islam, the imams were recognized – to a greater or lesser degree – as the heads of the Zaidi community and could, therefore, count on a measure of support and loyalty.  Not all the tribes, however, accepted the temporal and even legal role that the imams arrogated to themselves; consequently, many imams (Imam Yahya and Imam Ahmad in the twentieth century included) complained bitterly about the tribes' inordinate political power.

See also
Alliance of Yemeni Tribes

References

 Almsaodi, Abdulaziz. Modern history of Yemen

Bibliography

External links 
Social History of Yemen

Arab militant groups
Yemeni Revolution
Tribes of Arabia
Yemeni tribes
Rebel groups in Yemen
Banu Hamdan
Organizations of the Arab Spring
Organizations of the Yemeni Crisis (2011–present)
Confederations